Trechus angusticollis is a species of ground beetle in the subfamily Trechinae. It was described by Kiesenwetter in 1850.

References

angusticollis
Beetles described in 1850